Ieuan ab Owain Glyndŵr was reputedly the illegitimate son of the last native Welsh Prince of Wales; Owain Glyndŵr. The possibility of his existence was uncovered through the work of Peter Bartrum which is currently being edited by the University of Wales Aberystwyth. Ieuan ab Owain and his descendants are detailed in Peniarth Manuscript 287 in the hand of Robert Vaughan of Hengwrt (c.1592-1667) and also in the manuscript known as Harley 1969 by Griffith Hughes (1634–1665) - the original manuscripts are kept at the National Library of Wales, Aberystwyth and the British Library respectively.

Ieuan, who is thought to have been born around 1380 and to have died around 1430, is thought to have had three sons:

 Maredudd ab Ieuan ab Owain Glyndŵr
 Robert ab Ieuan ab Owain Glyndŵr
 Iorwerth ab Ieuan ab Owain Glyndŵr

Manuscript sources
 Robert Vaughan of Hengwrt (1592–1667), Peniarth 287 (folio 376), 
 
 Griffith Hughes (1634–1665), Harley 1969 (folio 19)

References 
 P. C. Bartrum, Welsh Genealogies A.D. 300 - 1400, 8 volumes (University of Wales Press, Cardiff, 1974). Bleddyn ap Cynfyn 5; Bleddyn ap Cynfyn 5 (A) (pages 32 and 67) and P. C. Bartrum, Welsh Genealogies AD 1400-1500, 18 volumes (National Library of Wales, 1983).
 The Bartrum Project, Department of Welsh, University of Wales, Aberystwyth

1380 births
1430 deaths
Welsh royalty